A  ( or , was a historical type of urban settlement similar to a market town in the former Polish–Lithuanian Commonwealth. After the partitions of Polish–Lithuanian Commonwealth at the end of the 18th-century, these settlements became widespread in the Austrian, German and Russian Empires. The vast majority of miasteczkos had significant or even predominant Jewish populations; these are known in English under the Yiddish term shtetl. Miasteczkos had a special administrative status other than that of town or city.

The meaning "small town" is somewhat misleading, since some 19th-century shtetls, such as Berdichev or Bohuslav counted over 15,000 people. Therefore, after Russian authorities annexed parts of Poland-Lithuania (which included parts of modern Poland, Belarus, Ukraine and Lithuania), they had difficulties in formally defining what a miasteczko is.

Typically miasteczkos grew out of or still remained private towns belonging to Polish-Lithuanian landlords (usually magnates), who sought to obtain royal privileges to establish markets and fairs, and to do business in liquor. The town owners favored the Jews in order for them to bring in trade, including trade in liquor.

After the incorporation of Polish lands into  the Russian Empire, the authorities started converting private towns into state-owned towns (Russian term: kazyonny gorod, literally "treasury-owned town"). This process intensified after the Polish November Uprising (1830–31). However the term mestechko continued to be applied to both private and state-seized towns.

In modern times in Poland miasteczko does not have a special administrative status, and the term is informally used for small towns, as well as for settlements which lost town privileges (see List of former cities of Poland).

In Lithuania miestelis does have a special administrative status and the term is used for small towns, usually smaller than a town (named miestas) or a city (usually named both miestas –  or didmiestis - ), but larger than a kaimas. The majority of inhabitants of miestelis should work in manufacturing, retail or service industries as opposed to a village type of settlement (kaimas), where the majority of inhabitants are employed in agriculture (there are some villages with more inhabitants than miestelis in Lithuania). Miestelis status is also applied for settlements which historically were more prominent than today, once had, but lost its town privileges. Usually a miestelis is inhabited between 500 and 3000 people. In 2021 there are 247 miestelis type settlements in Lithuania (235 in 1986).

In modern Russia the borrowed term does not have universal official meaning, however some administrative divisions officially define the category of mestechko of rural settlements.

References

Market towns
Types of towns
Subdivisions of the Polish–Lithuanian Commonwealth